Back from Hell is the fifth studio album by American hip hop group Run-D.M.C., released on October 16, 1990, by Profile Records. The album was produced by the group members themselves.

The album is notable for adopting more of a street attitude than their previous albums as well as using more curse words. The songs "Faces" and "Pause" introduce a new musical style: new jack swing. This album features vocals from Aaron Hall ("Don't Stop") and also Jam Master Jay rapping for the first time ("Faces", "Not Just Another Groove").

The album has sold over 300,000 copies in the United States. Back from Hell peaked at number 81 on the US Billboard 200, and number 16 on the Top R&B/Hip Hop Albums chart.

The album features three the Billboard singles: "Pause", "What's It All About" and "Faces". "What's It All About" also hit the UK Singles Chart

The album was reissued by Arista Records in 1999, 2003 and 2018.

Background
Before Run, DMC and Jay went in the studio to begin recording Back from Hell, they were in trouble: Jay owed the IRS nearly $300,000 in state taxes dating back to 1989, Run was struggling to cope with severe depression and DMC became reliant on alcohol to help him overcome his debilitating stage fright, downing as many as 12 40-ounce bottles of malt liquor a day.

Critical reception

The album received poor reviews from music critics. Alex Henderson from AllMusic gave Back from Hell three stars out of five, saying "By 1990, Run-D.M.C.'s popularity had decreased dramatically, and the Queens residents had lost a lot of ground to both West Coast gangster rappers like Ice Cube, Ice-T and Compton's Most Wanted. With its fifth album, Back From Hell, Run-D.M.C. set out to regain the support of the hardcore rap audience and pretty much abandoned rock-influenced material in favor of stripped-down, minimalist and consistently street-oriented sounds. Not outstanding but certainly enjoyable, such gritty reflections on urban life as "Livin' in the City," "The Ave." and "Faces" made it clear that Run-D.M.C. was still well worth hearing.

Mark Coleman of Rolling Stone gave the album two stars out of five, saying "Gratuitous obscenities abound on the record, and they sure don't make Run-D.M.C.'s new tales of street violence and urban injustice any more convincing. Brandishing guns and bantering with racist cops, Run and D.M.C. may well be telling it like it is in 1990. But on most of Back From Hell they sound like actors playing out roles rather than artists dramatizing their own lives. DJ Jam Master Jay is at the top of his form, however. The music on Back From Hell is astounding: Jay constructs vivid minisoundtracks from the detritus of pop culture, laying samples on top of samples without overdoing it. Unfortunately, that deep musical backing just throws more emphasis on the words, which can't carry the weight."

Videos
Four video clips were released on songs from the album: "Pause", "What's It All About", "Faces" and "The Ave.". And the video for the song "Pause" was released in two versions, the second version contained an introduction from The Afros, a new group of Jam Master Jay, signed to his new label, JMJ Records.

Track listing
The information about samples was taken from WhoSampled.

Chart positions

Album

Singles

Notes
 1 - "Pause" charted as a Double A-side with "Ghostbusters"

References

External links
 Back from Hell at Discogs
 Back from Hell at RapGenius
 25 Years On: Run DMC's Back From Hell Revisited
 RUN-D.M.C. Return To Conscious Lyrics On Back From Hell | Album Review

1990 albums
Run-DMC albums
Profile Records albums
Albums recorded at Chung King Studios